is a Japanese video game development studio based in Shinjuku, Tokyo. It was founded on the 29th of July, 2005 and employs 14 people as of April 2021. Think Garage games are published by Square Enix.

Video games 
 Dragon Quest & Final Fantasy in Itadaki Street Portable (May 2006), board game on PlayStation Portable
 Itadaki Street DS (June 2007), board game on Nintendo DS
 Lord of Vermilion (June 2008), strategy game on arcade
 Sigma Harmonics (August 2008), role-playing game on Nintendo DS

External links 
  

Software companies established in 2005
Software companies based in Tokyo
Video game development companies
Video game companies of Japan
Japanese companies established in 2005
Video game companies established in 2005